God's House may refer to:

God's House (film), a documentary film currently in production
God's House, Cambridge, a former college of the University of Cambridge
God's House Hospital, a group of almshouses in Southampton, England
God's House Tower, a fortified entrance gate to Southampton